The White Rosette is a 1916 American silent drama film directed by Donald MacDonald starring Eugenie Forde, Helen Rosson, and Richard La Reno.

Cast
 Eugenie Forde as Lady Elfrieda / Frieda Carewe
 Helen Rosson as Lady Maud / Joan Long
 Richard La Reno
 Harry von Meter as Baron Edward / Pierpont Carewe
 William Stowell as Lord Kerrigan / Van Kerr
 Forrest Taylor as Sir Errol / Thomas Eric

External links

1916 films
1916 drama films
Silent American drama films
American silent feature films
American black-and-white films
American Film Company films
1910s American films